These are the official results of the Men's Hammer Throw event at the 1990 European Championships in Split, Yugoslavia , held at Stadion Poljud on 30 and 31 August 1990. There were a total number of twenty participating athletes.

Medalists

Abbreviations
All results shown are in metres

Records

Qualification

Group A

Group B

Final

Participation
According to an unofficial count, 20 athletes from 11 countries participated in the event.

 (1)
 (3)
 (1)
 (2)
 (2)
 (2)
 (2)
 (2)
 (1)
 (1)
 (3)

See also
 1987 Men's World Championships Hammer Throw (Rome)
 1988 Men's Olympic Hammer Throw (Seoul)
 1990 Hammer Throw Year Ranking
 1991 Men's World Championships Hammer Throw (Tokyo)
 1992 Men's Olympic Hammer Throw (Barcelona)

References

 Results
 hammerthrow.wz

Hammer throw
Hammer throw at the European Athletics Championships